Cephalorhizum is a genus of flowering plants belonging to the family Plumbaginaceae.

Its native range is Central Asia, Afghanistan.

Species:

Cephalorhizum coelicolor 
Cephalorhizum micranthum 
Cephalorhizum oopodum 
Cephalorhizum pachycormum 
Cephalorhizum popovii 
Cephalorhizum turcomanicum

References

Plumbaginaceae
Caryophyllales genera